Mysmenidae is a spider family with about 135 described species in thirteen genera. The family is one of the least well known of the orb-weaving spiders because of their small size and cryptic behaviour. These spiders are found in humid habitats such as among leaf litter and in caves.

Distribution
Species occur in the Americas, Africa, Asia, Europe, New Guinea and several islands.

Genera

, the World Spider Catalog accepts the following genera:

Brasilionata Wunderlich, 1995 — Brazil
Chanea Miller, Griswold & Yin, 2009 — China
Gaoligonga Miller, Griswold & Yin, 2009 — Vietnam
Isela Griswold, 1985 — Kenya, South Africa
Maymena Gertsch, 1960 — North America, Saint Vincent and the Grenadines, Central America, Peru
Microdipoena Banks, 1895 — Africa, United States, Paraguay, Asia, Oceania
Mosu Miller, Griswold & Yin, 2009 — China
Mysmena Simon, 1894 — Oceania, Asia, Caribbean, North America, Algeria, Spain, South America, Panama
Mysmeniola Thaler, 1995 — Venezuela
Mysmenopsis Simon, 1898 — South America, Caribbean, North America, Central America
Phricotelus Simon, 1895 — Sri Lanka
Simaoa Miller, Griswold & Yin, 2009
Trogloneta Simon, 1922 — Brazil, Asia, United States

See also
 List of Mysmenidae species

References

 
Araneomorphae families
Taxa named by Alexander Petrunkevitch